Tallegalla is a rural locality in the City of Ipswich, Queensland, Australia.

Geography
Most of Tallegalla lies within the Lockyer Creek catchment area, but small portion exist in both the Brisbane River and Bremer River catchments.  In the west of Tallegalla, the terrain is elevated by the Little Liverpool Range.

History
The origin of the suburb name is from the Latin word Talegalla which was the genus name for the Brush-turkey.  John Dart, the first to settle in the area, choose the name when he applied to open a postal receiving office at his farm.

Tallegalla State School opened on 10 June 1879. It closed on 18 December 1992.

On Monday 17 May 1880 a Wesleyan Chapel was opened.

The Marburg railway line, which operated from 1911 to 1964, had a number of stations in the locality (from north to south):

 Birru railway station
 Talegalla railway station
 Cabanda railway station

Heritage listings
Tallegalla has a number of heritage-listed sites including:
 Rosewood-Minden Road: the former Tallegalla State School
Tallegalla Cemetery: Memorial and monumental area

References

External links

 
City of Ipswich
Localities in Queensland